West Ilsley is a village and civil parish in Berkshire, England. The population of the village at the 2011 Census was 332.

Location and amenities
It is situated in West Berkshire, north of Newbury on the Berkshire Downs. The companion village of East Ilsley is approximately a mile to the southeast. West Ilsley has a public house, The Harrow, and a well supported cricket club. The Ridgeway passes within a mile of the village.

History
The etymology of the word Ilsley is that it is derived from Hilde-Laege which means "Place of conflict", and either West or East Ilsley may be the site of the Battle of Ashdown, Alfred the Great's victory against the Danes. The original Morland Brewery was first set up in West Ilsley in 1711.

Church
The parish church of All Saints dates back to the 12th century. It is now one of nine village churches in the East Downland benefice, which is part of the Newbury Deanery in the Diocese of Oxford.  In 1616, the Italian Archbishop, Marco Antonio de Dominis was appointed Dean of Windsor and Rector of West Ilsley by King James I. His successor, Dr Godfrey Goodman, sheltered King Charles I at West Ilsley Rectory during the English Civil War.  In the churchyard are two trees planted by Queen Victoria's daughter Princess Helena and her husband Prince Christian, to commemorate the rebuilding of the church's chancel in 1878.

Transport
West Ilsley is served by Newbury and District bus services 6 and 6A from Newbury.

Notable residents
Marco Antonio de Dominis for a time lived in West Ilsley.
Edmund Kerchever Chambers, Medieval and Renaissance scholar
Horse Trainer Mick Channon (the former Southampton footballer), who moved into the village after buying the stables of the former Queen's trainer, Dick Hern.

See also
 List of places in Berkshire
 List of civil parishes in Berkshire

References

External links 

West Ilsley village site
Royal Berkshire History: West Ilsley

Villages in Berkshire
West Berkshire District
Civil parishes in Berkshire